Vishal Sharma (born 20 September 1978) is an Indian former cricketer. He played one first-class match for Delhi in 1999/00.

See also
 List of Delhi cricketers

References

External links
 

1978 births
Living people
Indian cricketers
Delhi cricketers
Cricketers from Delhi